Francisco Bustillos Diaz Sr. (May 28, 1937 – March 3, 2011), also known professionally as Paquito Diaz, was a veteran Filipino actor and movie director. He specialized in antagonist roles for both action and comedy films.

Biography

Early life and career
Diaz was born in Arayat, Pampanga, Philippines to Silvino Diaz and Maria Bustillos. He had eight siblings, including Romy Diaz. He was famous for his villain roles, although he also had the ability to portray protagonist roles, mostly supporting, or as comic relief alongside his longtime friend Fernando Poe Jr.

Among the memorable non-villain roles he portrayed were in Walang Matigas na Tinapay sa Mainit na Kape, where his brother Romy and Dindo Arroyo played the main villains of the film, and Ang Dalubhasa (without his moustache). Other non-villain appearances include: Bobocop is a comedy film where he plays the role as a police officer which starring Joey Marquez with Max Alvarado as the main villain; Eagle Squad, where he played a dedicated and good police officer alongside Robin Padilla, Jinggoy Estrada, Edu Manzano, Ricky Davao, and Monsour del Rosario with Jaime Fabregas as the main antagonist; He portrayed his role as an NBI informer in Doring Dorobo, NBI which starring Eddie Garcia with Eddie Gutierrez as the corrupt police chief superintendent; Squala, as the father of the character of his son Joko with John Regala and Dick Israel portraying the villains; Bayadra Brothers (Bayadra is a pun of Viagra), alongside Jimmy Santos and Berting Labra. He plays the role as Ramon, an office manager in a comedy film Gawa Na Ang Bala Para Sa Akin which starred Vic Sotto and Panchito Alba with Ruel Vernal as the main antagonist. Estudyante Blues, also as the father of the character of his son Joko, and Pera O Bayong as Don Juanito, starring Willie Revillame, John Estrada and Randy Santiago with Mark Gil as the right-hand man of his character and the main antagonist of that film.

He also appeared in villain roles in comedy films as the main antagonist and also in supporting/non-villain roles that stars mostly Dolphy, Redford White, Vic Sotto, Joey Marquez, Herbert Bautista, Joey De Leon, Jimmy Santos and the late actors Chiquito, Babalu, Panchito and Rene Requiestas.

He also gained popularity in the 1990s where he played title roles in two comedy flicks: Daddy Goon (touted as his launching movie) where he was ably supported by Herbert Bautista, Manilyn Reynes, Eddie Gutierrez (villain) and child wonder Aiza Seguerra; and The Good, The Bad and The Ugly where he shared billing with matinee idol Gabby Concepcion and box-office comedian Rene Requiestas. He also tried his hand in producing a movie in 2002 via Mga Batang Lansangan... Ngayon which starred his son Joko and matinee idol Bobby Andrews.

Later life and death
After suffering from hypertension and a stroke, which at one time left him comatose, he had to sell the family house and lot including his car. His vision was impaired for the same health reasons. He was diagnosed with pneumonia and sepsis.

He suffered a hemorrhagic stroke in 2002 and died on March 3, 2011, at the age of 73, due to complications from pneumonia.

Personal life
His father was a Mexican American. His brother Romy was also an actor, as well as his wife (Nena) and children (Joko and Cheska) who are also actors. Before Diaz became an actor, he was a basketball player with the Ateneo Blue Eagles from 1955 to 1956 and FEU-D Baby Tamaraws.

Filmography

Movies

References

External links

1937 births
2011 deaths
20th-century Filipino male actors
21st-century Filipino male actors
Ateneo Blue Eagles men's basketball players
Burials at the Manila Memorial Park – Sucat
Deaths from pneumonia in the Philippines
Paquito
Filipino film directors
Filipino male comedians
Filipino people of American descent
Filipino people of Mexican descent
Filipino people of Spanish descent
Kapampangan people
Male actors from Pampanga
People from Albay
People from Pampanga